Pissodes is a genus of weevils described by Ernst Friedrich Germar in 1817.

These insects live on conifers. They are widely distributed in the Northern Hemisphere, their distribution mirroring that of plants in the Pinaceae, the pine family, which includes most of their host trees.

A few Pissodes species are considered to be pests, such as Pissodes strobi, P. nemorensis, and P. terminalis, because they do significant damage to trees.

There are at least 140 described species in Pissodes.

See also
 List of Pissodes species

References

External links

 

Molytinae
Insect vectors of plant pathogens
Curculionidae genera